Still the Drums is a 2009 film written, produced, directed and edited by actor Talbot Perry Simons. His first film, it premiered on U.S. Cable TV's Movies On Demand Pay Per View in January 2013.

The title Still the Drums is an excerpt from the poem "The Illusion of War" written after the Civil war by English author Richard Le Gallienne.

Still the Drums is about four best friends that went to Vietnam as U.S. Marines. The story deals with friendship, patriotism, heroism and post-traumatic stress disorder. We look in on these soldiers thirty-nine years after their war, (the Vietnam War) has been over.

Still the Drums had premiered on August 1, 2009, at the Regency Fairfax Cinema on Beverly Blvd. In West Hollywood, California, it was selected as a finalist in the 2009 New York International Independent Film and Video Festival.

References

External links
 

2009 films
2009 drama films
American drama films
2000s English-language films
2000s American films